Circle packing in a square is a packing problem in recreational mathematics, where the aim is to pack  unit circles into the smallest possible square. Equivalently, the problem is to arrange  points in a unit square aiming to get the greatest minimal separation, between points.  To convert between these two formulations of the problem, the square side for unit circles will be .

Solutions
Solutions (not necessarily optimal) have been computed for every .
The obvious square packing is optimal for 1, 4, 9, 16, 25, and 36 circles (the six smallest square numbers), but ceases to be optimal for larger squares from 49 onwards.

Circle packing in a rectangle
Dense packings of circles in non-square rectangles have also been the subject of many investigations.

See also
Square packing in a circle

References

Circle packing